The 1967 Lafayette Leopards football team was an American football team that represented Lafayette College during the 1967 NCAA College Division football season. Lafayette tied for fourth in the Middle Atlantic Conference, University Division, and finished second in the Middle Three Conference.

In their first year under head coach Harry Gamble, the Leopards compiled a 4–5 record. Robert Albus was the team captain.

Lafayette went 1–1 against its Middle Three rivals, losing to Rutgers and beating Lehigh.

Lafayette played its home games at Fisher Field on College Hill in Easton, Pennsylvania.

Schedule

References

Lafayette
Lafayette
Lafayette Leopards football seasons
Lafayette Leopards football